The British publishing house of Hart-Davis, MacGibbon was formed in 1972 by its parent group, Granada. The parent company had acquired the publishing concern of Rupert Hart-Davis in 1963 and the house of MacGibbon & Kee (founded by James MacGibbon and Robert Kee) in 1968.

When Granada exited the publishing business in 1983, the imprint was sold to William Collins, Sons of Glasgow.

References

Book publishing companies of the United Kingdom
Publishing companies established in 1972